Sergius II (? – July 1019) was the Ecumenical Patriarch of Constantinople from July 1001 to 1019.

According to the history of John Skylitzes, he was a relative of the celebrated 9th-century patriarch Photius. In 1001, he was abbot of the Monastery of Manuel, which had been re-founded by Photius, when he was elected to fill the patriarchal see (June/July).

According to the later legend, Sergius II was in the conflict with the Pope Sergius IV.

According to Skylitzes, he died in July 1019. His successor was Eustathius.

References

Sources
 Official website of the Ecumenic Patriarchate of Constantinople
 

10th-century births
1019 deaths
11th-century patriarchs of Constantinople
Year of birth unknown
Basil II